RadioTux is a German internet radio show. The topics are mostly around free and open source software, free operating systems like *BSD and Linux, as well as on sociopolitical issues. It was founded in 2001.

There have been made more than 100 transmissions and many interviews with famous people like Mark Shuttleworth, Miguel de Icaza, Hans Reiser, Jon “Maddog” Hall, Richard Stallman and so on.
Since 2005 there are also several podcasts available one is the interview feed in English.

Everybody can participate on RadioTux. All topics are welcome: there are no limits.
The site of the project is based on a wiki, which means that anyone can use his/her web browser to enhance the contents of the pages by editing them. This makes it really easy for everyone to participate.

Internal communication works over a mailing list, which is open for everyone to listen in.

Radio on demand 
Shows are produced on a monthly basis. Several volunteers are involved in this process; they include reports, essays, interviews and free music. Depending on the material these shows take 30 to 60 minutes. Users interested in the information only can download a stripped down version without music.

The shows are available in MP3 as well as in the free Ogg/Vorbis format.

Up to now (July 2008) more than 80 shows have been produced. Some of them have been broadcast live at the Berlin radio station.

On the website everyone may leave suggestions for upcoming shows.

Podcasts 
When RadioTux started, podcasts were not yet known, so it can be considered being one of the first podcasts which came up and which is still existing.

Single articles and interviews are made available as podcast. So current news are instantly available. Due to categorisation users can subscribe to the newsfeeds of topics they are interested to and load them directly to MP3 player. This compatibility with current mobile playback devices is the reason why the podcast uses the MP3 format.

Live 
RadioTux often participates at Linux and similar events and reports live. Live broadcasts as comprehensive programming have been transmitted from LinuxTag, the Linux World Conference & Expo and the Chemnitzer Linux-Tage.

On live events RadioTux is being supported by the free radio station Kanal Ratte which provides studio equipment, streaming servers and airtime. Several shows are presented by Kanal Ratte staff and transmitted live into their programme which is available via FM, cable and livestream.

At the Linux World Conference & Expo 2006 in Cologne RadioTux for the first time has been media partner of an event.

Since November 2006 the weekly show RadioTux@HoRadS is presented at the Hochschulradio Stuttgart on FM and livestream. The common topics on Linux and free software were discussed there with studio guests, articles from the RadioTux archive (podcasts, interviews) provide appropriate background information.

See also 
 List of technology podcasts

References

External links 
 
 : podcast episodes

Internet radio in Germany
Technology podcasts
German podcasts
Audio podcasts